The Solomon Islands Scout Association (SISA), (formerly the Solomon Islands branch of The Scout Association (Solomons Pijin: Skaut Belong Solomone), founded in 1928, is a National Scout Organisation of the World Organization of the Scout Movement (WOSM). It was a branch of the United Kingdom Scout Association for historical reasons and because the number of Scouts in the Solomon Islands was relatively small. Moves  to achieve official WOSM membership began as early as 2007, and this recognition was granted in June 2021. The Chief Scout role is traditionally held by the Governor General, Nathaniel Waena.

Background

Scouts from the Solomon Islands participated in the 19th World Jamboree in Chile in 1998.

The membership badge of the Solomon Islands branch of The Scout Association features the national flag. The older variant shows a palm tree, a symbol in use since the Solomon Islands was a colonial branch of British Scouting.

Sources

See also
The Girl Guides Association of Solomon Islands

Scouting and Guiding in the Solomon Islands
Overseas branches of Scouting and Guiding associations
1928 establishments in the United Kingdom